Statistics of Division 2 in the 1936–37 season.

Overview
It was contested by 17 teams, and Lens won the championship.

League standings

References

France - List of final tables (RSSSF)

Ligue 2 seasons
France
2